Wilma Gibbs Moore (March 1951 – April 18, 2018) was a librarian and archivist from Indiana who preserved and interpreted the African American history in Indiana. She wrote articles and edited books on the history.

Early life and education
Wilma Gibbs was born in Indianapolis in March 1951 to Tessie Arlene and William Joseph Gibbs. In 1969, she graduated from Crispus Attucks High School. Gibbs attended Indiana University and received a bachelor's degree in sociology in 1973. She went on to earn a Master of Library and Information Science in 1974.

Career
Moore contributed her knowledge and expertise to a number of organizations promoting African American history and culture, including the Association for the Study of African American Life and History and the Indiana African American Genealogy Group. She was a key contributor to documentation of the Underground Railroad in Indiana through her work on Indiana Freedom Trails, and the Indiana Landmarks' African American Landmarks Committee. In recognition of her work, the American Association for State and Local History gave her an Award of Merit, and the Indiana Historical Society honored her with the Eli Lilly Lifetime Achievement Award.

Moore worked for Indiana University Libraries and the Indianapolis Public Library. She spent 30 years at the Indiana Historical Society Library as Senior Archivist in the African American History Program, retiring in 2017. She served as the editor of Indiana Historical Society's Black History News and Notes publication from 1986 to 2007. She authored the 1993 book Indiana's African-American Heritage.

Moore died on April 18, 2018. In 2018, the non-profit Indiana Humanities established the Wilma Gibbs Moore Fellowships to support humanities research into structural racism and anti-black racial injustice in Indiana.

Awards
2016 American Association for State and Local History Leadership in History Award "for a lifetime of dedication to preserving and interpreting Indiana's African American heritage."
2017 Eli Lilly Lifetime Achievement Award "for her extraordinary contributions over an extended period of time to the field of history."

References

1951 births
2018 deaths
African-American librarians
American librarians
American women librarians
Indiana University alumni
20th-century African-American people
21st-century African-American people
20th-century African-American women
21st-century African-American women